Vincentia may refer to:

Places
 Vincentia, New South Wales, town in Australia
 Vicentina, Brazil
 Vicenza, city in northern Italy

Organisms
 Vincentia (fish), a genus of fishes
 Vincentia, junior synonym of the plant genus Grewia

See also
 Vincent (disambiguation)
 Vincentian (disambiguation)
 Vincenza